Éva Örkényi (born August 27, 1932 in Törökszentmiklós) is a Hungarian actress. Her acting career began with the 1938 film Az örök titok and ended in 2002. She has appeared on stage, in films, and on television.

Early life
Born in Törökszentmiklós in 1932, Örkényi was a year old when her family moved to Budapest. Her father worked in a bank but aspired to be an actor or writer. Örkényi had her first acting experience at age three in a children's theatre. By age five, she had her first contract with the Artúr Lakner children's theatre.

Film and television credits

Film
Az örök titok (1938)
Pénz áll a házhoz (1939)
Magyar feltámadás (1939)
Isten rabjai (1941)
Mágnás Miska (1949)
Forró mezők (1949)
Különös házasság (1951)
Erkel (1952)
Kölyök (1959)
A szélhámosnő (1963)

Television
 És mégis mozog a föld 1-3 (1973)
 Irgalom (1973) 
 Osztrigás Mici (1983)
 Zenés TV színház (1983)
 Már megint a 7.B! (1985)
 A nap lovagja (1987)
 Maigret (1992)
 Rizikó (1993)
 Szomszédok (1994)
 Barátok közt (2000)
 A Nagyasszony (2002)

Theatre

External links

Örkényi Éva, port.hu
Örkényi Éva, Hungarian Movie Database

References

1932 births
20th-century Hungarian actresses
21st-century Hungarian actresses
Hungarian film actresses
Hungarian stage actresses
Hungarian television actresses
People from Jász-Nagykun-Szolnok County
Living people